Jonas Erwig-Drüppel (born 20 July 1991) is a German footballer who plays for SSVg Velbert.

Career
Erwig-Drüppel began his senior career in 2010 at FC Schalke 04's reserve team. After two seasons he moved to 2. Bundesliga side Eintracht Braunschweig, where he made his professional debut on 15 September 2012 in a game against SSV Jahn Regensburg. Erwig-Drüppel's contract was not renewed after the 2013–14 Bundesliga season. On 24 July 2014, he joined SSV Jahn Regensburg. In winter 2015, he transferred to VfB Oldenburg. In the summer 2015, Erwig-Drüppel joined SC Verl.

References

External links
 
 

1991 births
Living people
People from Dorsten
Sportspeople from Münster (region)
Footballers from North Rhine-Westphalia
German footballers
SpVgg Erkenschwick players
FC Schalke 04 II players
Eintracht Braunschweig players
Eintracht Braunschweig II players
SSV Jahn Regensburg players
VfB Oldenburg players
SC Verl players
SG Wattenscheid 09 players
Wuppertaler SV players
Rot-Weiss Essen players
SSVg Velbert players
Association football midfielders
Association football forwards
2. Bundesliga players
3. Liga players
Regionalliga players
Oberliga (football) players